The 1999 Melbourne Storm season was the second in the club's history. Coached by Chris Anderson and captained by Glenn Lazarus, they competed in the National Rugby League's 1999 season, finishing the regular season in 3rd out of 17 teams. Melbourne reached the 1999 NRL Grand Final and defeated the St George Illawarra Dragons, claiming their first premiership.

Stability in playing talent and continued off-field support from Melbourne's core supporters, produced a continued improvement in 1999. Injury took away Scott Hill and Robbie Kearns for much of the season. Melbourne's fullback Robbie Ross, winger Matt Geyer and front-row forwards Rodney Howe and Glenn Lazarus were all selected to play for New South Wales in the 1999 State of Origin series.

In their final home game at Olympic Park, the Storm lost to the North Sydney Bears and having had a bye in the last round and they had no opportunity to lift their form before fronting the St. George Illawarra Dragons in their first final. The Storm ultimately lost this game to the Dragons by 34-10 and looked set for a repeat of the 1998 exit.

Despite lacking confidence, Melbourne Storm outlasted the Canterbury Bulldogs by 24–22 to reach the preliminary final against Parramatta Eels. The Eels had let a place in the Grand Final slip out of their grasp in the same match in 1998, and were tipped to be much hungrier for a win than the Storm. Parramatta took a hold on the match, but the Storm did not relent and thanks to some last-ditch tackling stayed in the game. A late try to the Storm saw them win by 18-16 and secure a re-match against the Dragons for the title.

The Storm had lost twice to the Dragons already in 1999 and by the time Melbourne was behind by 0–14 at half time, it was more than apparent that St. George – Illawarra were going to take the premiership in their first ever season. There was nothing in the Storm's performance to indicate that a comeback was possible.

But Melbourne Storm recovered from their poor start with inspiring efforts from Paul Marquet, Brett Kimmorley and Tawera Nikau. Into the final minutes of the game the Dragons led 18-14 but were forced to drop out from their own line. On the fifth tackle Kimmorley kicked high into the Dragons' corner. As the Storm's winger Craig Smith caught the ball over the try-line he was knocked unconscious in a head-high tackle by Jamie Ainscough and lost the ball.

Referee Bill Harrigan deferred to the video referee and the replay clearly showed that if not for the illegal tackle Smith would have scored a try. A penalty try was awarded giving the Storm's Matt Geyer a conversion from in front of the posts to take Melbourne Storm to a 20–18 lead and the title.

Season Summary
 Pre season – Taking its full squad to Brisbane for the first trial of the season, Melbourne led 14–4 against Auckland Warriors, before a spirited fourth quarter comeback lifted the Warriors to a 16–14 win. Melbourne then made their second trip to Albury to take on the Canberra Raiders and in front of over 7,000 fans, finished strongly to win 24–18.
 Round 1 – Melbourne open the 1999 NRL season, winning the first game of the season 32–10.
 Round 2 – Former Melbourne er John Carlaw scored a try against the club in Balmain Tigers 16–6 victory. Carlaw said he "just wanted to prove a point."
 Round 3 – Storm thrash Brisbane Broncos 48–6 to inflict Brisbane's heaviest defeat to date in their history. Aaron Moule becomes the first Melbourne player to be sent to the sin bin.
 22 March – Melbourne coach Chris Anderson is appointed Kangaroos coach.
 23 March – Stephen Kearney is suspended for five matches for a grade one dangerous throw charge, the suspension also ruling him out of the 1999 Anzac Test.
 Round 4 – Melbourne run the risk of censure from the NRL after introducing "Skirt Man" to the Olympic Park crowd before the game against Canterbury-Bankstown Bulldogs.  Storm CEO Chris Johns claimed the NRL judiciary's decision to suspend Stephen Kearney for five matches would see players "all wearing skirts".
 Round 6 – In his first game back following a 22-match suspension for steroid use, Rodney Howe is charged with a grade two careless high tackle in a tackle that broke the jaw of Auckland Warriors  Jason Death. He later is suspended for one match.
 Round 8 – Matt Geyer sets a new club record for points in a game with 24 (2 tries, 8 goals) against South Sydney Rabbitohs, eclipsing Craig Smith's mark of 18 points against Western Suburbs Magpies. 
 Round 10 – In the club's first ever game in Western Australia, Melbourne thrash Western Suburbs Magpies 62–6 at Lathlain Park. Matt Geyer sets two new club records – most points in a game (34); tries in a game (4). He also equalled Craig Smith's club record 9 goals in a game. Geyer's 34 points was the sixth highest individual scoring effort in league history.
 18 May – Robbie Kearns is thrown from a horse during a NSW Blues Origin "bonding camp" in the Megalong Valley organised by coach Wayne Pearce. Kearns suffers a broken collarbone, and is ruled out of action for months. Melbourne coach Chris Anderson later blasts Pearce in his newspaper column: "As far as I'm concerned, any coach who puts blokes on horses mid-season, let alone before an important representative clash, is off their rocker."
 Round 13 – Melbourne lose to joint venture club St George Illawarra Dragons in the first meeting between the clubs.
 8 June – Scott Hill undergoes surgery on a shoulder injury ruling him out for the rest of the season, while club officials call for State of Origin players to be released back to their clubs on the weekend before any dead rubber games.
 17 June – Paul Rauhihi is released from his contract with Melbourne to sign with Newcastle Knights. Rauhihi never played a first grade game for Melbourne.
 23 June – Chairman John Ribot confirms Melbourne has been investigating a possible move to the under construction Docklands Stadium in 2000.
 6 July – The NSWRL tell Melbourne that under no circumstances will they pay compensation to Robbie Kearns for the horse riding accident.
 19 July – Tony Martin suffers serious facial injuries after a cycling accident.
 Round 21 – Melbourne inflict Cronulla-Sutherland Sharks first home defeat of the season, winning 26–18 in windy conditions.
 28 July – Melbourne captain Glenn Lazarus announces he will retire at the end of the 1999 season to take up a coaching role with Canberra Raiders.
 5 August – Storm lodge an official claim for compensation with the ARL on behalf of Robbie Kearns for income lost due to the horse riding accident.
 14 August – Scott Hill suffers serious head injuries after being assaulted outside a nightclub on the NSW north coast.
 Round 24 – Melbourne win their sixth straight game (a new club record), winning the final home game of the season 44–14 against Western Suburbs, in what will be the final meeting between the teams before the Magpies merger with Balmain Tigers to form the Wests Tigers. In his 250th game, Glenn Lazarus kicks the only goal in his first grade career, converting a late try in his farewell to the Olympic Park crowd.
 Round 25 – North Sydney Bears upset Melbourne 20–24 at North Sydney Oval in what will be that club's last ever NRL game. As a result, Melbourne end the season third on the NRL ladder.
 29 August – Halfback Brett Kimmorley ends speculation he was leaving the club by signing a new three-year contract to stay in Melbourne.
 Qualifying Final – Sixth placed St. George Illawarra Dragons upset Melbourne at Olympic Park in the first week of the 1999 NRL finals, with Nathan Blacklock scoring a hat trick for the visitors.
 Semi Final – Melbourne advance to the preliminary finals with a tight win over Canterbury-Bankstown Bulldogs, with Matt Geyer scoring the winning try after replacing Ben Anderson who had been dropped after the loss to St. George Illawarra.
 Preliminary Final – Coming from 6-16 down midway through the second half, fast-finishing Melbourne stun Parramatta Eels to win 18–16 to progress to the 1999 NRL Grand Final. Victorian viewers are left angry as extended coverage of the 1999 Victorian state election results delays live television coverage of the game on GTV-9.
 21 September – Stephen Kearney is cleared to play in the Grand Final by the NRL Judiciary, despite NRL Commissioner Jim Hall saying Kearney had "established contact" with the head of Parramatta's Jason Smith's head and neck during the Preliminary Final. Hall was quoted as saying: "I cannot prove there was deliberate contact, and a striking charge must be deliberate."
 Grand Final – In front of a rugby league world record crowd of 107,999, Melbourne Storm stage a comeback 20–18 victory over St. George Illawarra Dragons to win the club's first premiership in just their second season. A penalty try to winger Craig Smith awarded by referee Bill Harrigan and video referee Chris Ward decides the outcome. Brett Kimmorley is awarded the Clive Churchill Medal, with Tawera Nikau unlucky not to receive the award, which was voted on by the ARL Kangaroos selectors.
 4 October – Tawera Nikau signs a two-year contract with Warrington Wolves, while Craig Smith rejects Melbourne's offer to stay with the club.
 19 October – Ben Anderson is released by the club.

Milestone games

Jerseys
During the 1998 season, Melbourne struck an apparel sponsorship agreement with Fila to manufacture and merchandise a range of club apparel. The home jersey was redesigned, maintaining the same colours as the 1998 version, but with white thunderbolts in a purple chevron. The gold trim and collars remained, and Honda continued with their sleeve advertisement.

A striking gold jersey was also designed as the club's clash colours; with that jersey worn in rounds 10, 15 and 23.

Fixtures

Pre season

Regular season

Source:

Finals

Ladder

1999 Coaching Staff
Head coach: Chris Anderson
Assistant coaches: Greg Brentnall & Steve Anderson
Football Manager: Michael Moore
Head physiotherapist: Tony Ayoub
Head Trainer: Steve Litvensky
Trainer: Aaron Salisbury

1999 squad

List current as of 27 July 2021

Player movements

Losses
 John Carlaw to Balmain Tigers
 Paul Rauhihi to Newcastle Knights
 John Wilshere to Released

Gains
 Stephen Kearney from Auckland Warriors
 Aseri Laing from Western Suburbs Magpies
 Tasesa Lavea from Junior All Blacks

1999 Premiership Team

Representative honours
This table lists all players who have played a representative match in 1999.

Statistics
This table contains playing statistics for all Melbourne Storm players to have played in the 1999 NRL season.

Statistics sources:

Scorers

Most points in a game: 34 points 
 Round 10 – Matt Geyer (4 tries, 9 Goals) vs Western Suburbs Magpies

Most tries in a game: 4 
 Round 10 – Matt Geyer vs Western Suburbs Magpies

Winning games

Highest score in a winning game: 62 points
 Round 10 vs Western Suburbs Magpies

Lowest score in a winning game: 16 points
 Round 22 vs Auckland Warriors

Greatest winning margin: 54 points
 Round 10 vs Western Suburbs Magpies

Greatest number of games won consecutively: 6
 Round 19 – Round 24

Losing games

Highest score in a losing game: 26 points
 Round 15 vs Newcastle Knights

Lowest score in a losing game: 6 points
 Round 2 vs Balmain Tigers
 Round 14 vs Canberra Raiders
 Round 18 vs Parramatta Eels

Greatest losing margin: 24 points
 Qualifying Final vs St George Illawarra Dragons

Greatest number of games lost consecutively: 3
 Round 13 – Round 15

Feeder team
Melbourne Storm reserve players again travelled to Brisbane each week to play with Queensland Cup team Norths Devils. Backing up the successful 1998 season by finishing second on the ladder, Norths Devils fell one game short of the 1999 Queensland Cup Grand Final, losing to eventual runners-up Redcliffe Dolphins in the Preliminary Final. Kevin Carmichael won his second straight player of the year award.

Awards and honours

Trophy Cabinet
 1999 Provan-Summons Trophy

Melbourne Storm Awards Night
Melbourne Storm Player of the Year: Brett Kimmorley 
Melbourne Storm Rookie of the Year: Matt Rua  
Melbourne Storm Clubman of the Year: Paul Marquet  
Mick Moore Chairman's Award: Glenn Lazarus

Additional Awards
 Clive Churchill Medal: Brett Kimmorley
 Rugby League Annual – Players of the Year: Brett Kimmorley
 Rugby League Annual – Team of the Year: Glenn Lazarus
 Rugby League Annual – Team of the Year: Stephen Kearney

Notes

References

Melbourne Storm seasons
Melbourne Storm season